Gafsa – Ksar International Airport  is an airport serving Gafsa in Tunisia.

Airlines and destinations

References

External links
 Tunisian Civil Aviation and Airports Authority (OACA)
 
 

Airports in Tunisia
Airports established in 1999
Gafsa Governorate
1999 establishments in Tunisia